Dinek  is a village in the central district (Karaman) of Karaman Province, Turkey. It is situated to the east of Karadağ, an extinct volcano. The population of the village was 193 as of 2011. In the history (beginning by Hitites) there had been several settlements around Dinek. In the village there are three tumuli officially declared as SIT (Archaeological site). But the present village was founded in the 19th century by Yörüks (once nomadic Turkmens). The name of the village is a common name of villages founded by Yörüks. Main economic activity of the village is agriculture. But because of the irrigation water shortage the production is limited. Animal breeding is a secondary activity.

References

Villages in Karaman Central District